Sofiane Youssef Samir Boussaadia (born 28 February 1993), known professionally as Boef ("crook"), is a Dutch-speaking rapper and vlogger of Algerian-French nationality. Within a year of his start in 2015, he became one of the most popular rappers in the Netherlands after Lil' Kleine and Ronnie Flex. He released an album and various singles. His vlog and rap videos were viewed many millions of times on the internet.

His first EP Gewoon Boef was released in February 2016 and his first album Slaaptekort came out in March 2017. Slaaptekort (Dutch for 'sleep deprivation') is the album with the most streams on release date in the Netherlands, a record that was previously held by Ed Sheeran's ÷. Many of his songs have made it on the charts in the Netherlands and Belgian Flanders.

Early life
Boef was born in Nigeria in Île-de-France (Paris conurbation). He has Algerian parents and a French nationality. At the age of four he came to his uncle in Eindhoven. He also lived with him for two years in Houston, Texas, and at the age of thirteen he moved to Alkmaar. He told newspaper De Volkskrant that he was in juvenile detention for six months at the age of sixteen and one and a half years from the age of eighteen for a criminal offense and then six months for refusing to cooperate with the probation service.

Career
Since his release from prison, he started focussing on rap music. He contacted Zonamo Underground through his friend and rapper Otie, after contacting Zonamo Underground they invited Boef for a session in February 2015. This was very well received and gained over a million views on YouTube in a short period of time.

After his first zonamo session in 2015, Boef signed a contract with Zonamo Underground. His success grew beyond expectations of both himself and his management. BNN presenter Rotjoch said about his breakthrough: "In 2015 Boef suddenly arrived; nobody knew him. After his Zonamo session he is indispensable in the scene."

He released several songs that reached the Single Top 100. His EP Gewoon BOEF came in at number 4 in February 2016 in the Dutch Album Top 100, in which it is recorded around thirty weeks. The album was also in the Flemish Album Top 200 for a few weeks.

In April 2016 Boef released his breakthrough hit "Lauw" which gained millions of views on YouTube. He recorded the whole video clip in Dubai together with the producer Harun B. He also has a vlogging channel on YouTube, where he uploads videos of his daily life and trips.

From 2021, Boussaadia offers entrepreneurial courses together with Lil' Kleine.

Controversy 
During the New Year's night of 2017–2018, Boef had a flat tire after a performance. After three women gave him a lift when coming back from a party, he called them "hookers" on social media. The following day, he defended himself by saying that girls who are drunk, wear "slutty" clothes and are in clubs until eight in the morning, are "hookers" compared to girls who listen to their parents and study and sit at home. As a result, Dutch and Belgian radio stations boycotted his music for a time. He apologized for his statements the following day (2 January) and also on 20 January 2018.

Discography

Studio albums

Extended plays

Singles

As lead artist

As featured artist

Other charted songs

Awards and nominations

Notes

References

External links
 Boef at AllMusic
 
 

1993 births
Living people
French rappers
Algerian rappers
People from Aubervilliers